Columbus metropolitan area may refer to:

 Columbus metropolitan area, Georgia, United States
 Columbus metropolitan area, Indiana, United States
 Columbus micropolitan area, Mississippi, United States
 Columbus micropolitan area, Nebraska, United States
 Columbus metropolitan area, Ohio, United States

See also
Columbus (disambiguation)